Reflections is the fourth studio album by German music producer and DJ Paul van Dyk. It was released on 7 October 2003 by Urban Records, Positiva Records and Mute Records. The album received a Grammy Award nomination in the category Best Dance/Electronica Album.

Track listing

References

External links 
 Reflections at Discogs

2003 albums
Mute Records albums
Paul van Dyk albums
Positiva Records albums
Urban Records albums